Elene Viles Odriozola (born 2 July 2001) is a Spanish footballer who plays as a midfielder for Real Sociedad.

Club career
Viles started her career at Lagun Onak.

References

External links
Profile at La Liga

2001 births
Living people
Women's association football midfielders
Spanish women's footballers
People from Azpeitia
Sportspeople from Gipuzkoa
Footballers from the Basque Country (autonomous community)
Real Sociedad (women) players
Primera División (women) players